The 1939 New Hampshire Wildcats football team was an American football team that represented the University of New Hampshire as a member of the New England Conference during the 1939 college football season. In its third year under head coach George Sauer, the team compiled a 3–5 record, being outscored by their opponents 126–71. The team played its home games at Lewis Field (also known as Lewis Stadium) in Durham, New Hampshire.

Schedule

The Harvard team was captained by "Torby" Macdonald, roommate of John F. Kennedy, who would go on serve in the United States House of Representatives from 1955 to 1976. The 1939 game remains the last time that the Harvard and New Hampshire football programs have met.

New Hampshire captain Burton Mitchell was inducted to the university's athletic hall of fame in 1998.

References

New Hampshire
New Hampshire Wildcats football seasons
New Hampshire Wildcats football